Brito is an unincorporated community in Merced County, California.

Climate
According to the Köppen Climate Classification system, Brito has a semi-arid climate, abbreviated "BSk" on climate maps.

References

Unincorporated communities in Merced County, California
Unincorporated communities in California